Elisabeth Sophie of Mecklenburg, Duchess of Brunswick-Lüneburg (20 August 1613 – 12 July 1676) was a German poet, composer and impresario.

Life 
She began studying music at the court of her father, Duke John Albert II of Mecklenburg-Güstrow, where was an orchestra known for its use of fine English musicians, such as William Brade. She moved to the court of Kassel, which also had a strong musical tradition, when the Thirty Years War threatened her court in 1628. In 1635, she married the learned Augustus the Younger, Duke of Brunswick-Lüneburg  with whom she had two children:
 Ferdinand Albert I, Duke of Brunswick-Lüneburg
 Marie Elisabeth of Brunswick-Wolfenbüttel.

Elisabeth Sophie was charged with organizing the court orchestra, and at times worked closely with Heinrich Schütz, who was appointed absentes Kapellmeister in 1655. She may have collaborated with him on arias in his Theatralische neue Vorstellung von der Maria Magdalena.

Most of Elisabeth Sophie 's compositions are hymns or devotional arias. Some of these were published in 1651 and 1667. The one printed in 1651, Vinetum evangelicum, Evangelischer Weinberg, is believed to have been the first music published by a woman in Germany. She also played a major role in establishing large court entertainments, including masquerades, plays, and ballets, to which she at times wrote librettos and music. Her additional involvement in these entertainments is unclear. Two of her dramatic works survive: Friedens Sieg (1642, Brunswick) and Glückwünschende Freudensdarstellung (Lüneburg, 1652).

Sibylle Ursula von Braunschweig-Lüneburg was her stepdaughter.

Footnotes

References
 (similar text in Grove Opera article by same author)

1613 births
1676 deaths
German Baroque composers
Duchesses of Brunswick-Lüneburg
German classical composers
German women poets
German women composers
Pupils of Heinrich Schütz
17th-century classical composers
Women classical composers
17th-century German women writers
17th-century German writers
New House of Brunswick
Daughters of monarchs